The acts of the 112th United States Congress includes all Acts of Congress and ratified treaties by the 112th United States Congress, which lasts from January 3, 2011 to January 3, 2013.

Acts include public and private laws, which are enacted after being passed by Congress and signed by the President, however if the President vetoes a bill it can still be enacted by a two-thirds vote in both houses. The Senate alone considers treaties, which are ratified by a two-thirds vote.

The 112th Congress, which was divided between a Democratic Senate and Republican House, passed only 283 acts. In terms of legislation enacted, it was the least productive Congress since modern records began in 1947, passing far fewer than the 906 passed by the 80th Congress (the "Do-nothing Congress").

Summary of actions
In this Congress, all of the statutes have been promulgated (signed) by President Barack Obama. None have been enacted by Congress over the President's veto.

Public laws

Private laws

Treaties

None ratified.

See also
 List of United States federal legislation
 Acts of the 111th United States Congress
 Acts of the 113th United States Congress

References

External links

 Authenticated Public and Private Laws from the Federal Digital System
 Legislation & Records Home: Treaties from the Senate
 Private Laws for the 112th Congress at Congress.gov
 Public Laws for the 112th Congress at Congress.gov
 

112